Pubis Angelical is a 1979 novel by acclaimed Argentine novelist Manuel Puig. It is perhaps Puig's work most influenced by pop culture. This can be seen in the montage imitating narrative technique, soap opera and science fiction elements. Also like other Puig works, it deals with psychological and sexual issues.

A film was released in 1981.

Plot introduction
The narrative alternates between separate narratives. One is reality, an Argentine woman confined to a Mexican sanitarium in the 1970s. The others are a representation of her unconscious. In this second narrative, the woman is in Central Europe in the years leading up to World War II. She is here involved in various intrigues, and carries on an extramarital romance. The third narrative, another representation of the protagonist's unconscious, is a science fiction tale involving a cyborg woman named W218 in a post-apocalyptic Polar Age, who serves the government by performing sexual therapy on aging men, and is therefore in a sense a government sponsored prostitute.

1979 novels
Novels by Manuel Puig
Argentine novels adapted into films
Novels set in Argentina
Seix Barral books